Nannocharax is a genus of distichodontid freshwater fishes found in Africa.

Species
There are currently 30 recognized species in this genus:
 Nannocharax altus Pellegrin, 1930
 Nannocharax ansorgii Boulenger, 1911
 Nannocharax brevis Boulenger, 1902
 Nannocharax dageti Jerep, Vari & Vreven, 2014 
 Nannocharax elongatus Boulenger, 1900
 Nannocharax fasciatus Günther, 1867
 Nannocharax fasciolaris Nichols & Boulton (fi), 1927
 Nannocharax gracilis Poll, 1939
 Nannocharax hastatus Jerep & Vari, 2014 
 Nannocharax hollyi Fowler, 1936
 Nannocharax intermedius Boulenger, 1903
 Nannocharax latifasciatus Coenen & Teugels, 1989
 Nannocharax lineomaculatus Blache & Miton, 1960
 Nannocharax luapulae Boulenger, 1915
 Nannocharax macropterus Pellegrin, 1926 (Broad-barred citharine)
 Nannocharax maculicauda Vari & Géry, 1981
 Nannocharax micros Fowler, 1936
 Nannocharax niloticus Joannis, 1835
 Nannocharax occidentalis Daget, 1959
 Nannocharax ogoensis Pellegrin, 1911
 Nannocharax parvus Pellegrin, 1906
 Nannocharax procatopus Boulenger, 1920
 Nannocharax pteron Fowler, 1936
 Nannocharax reidi Vari & Ferraris, 2004
 Nannocharax rubrolabiatus Van den Bergh, Teugels, Coenen & Ollevier, 1995
 Nannocharax schoutedeni Poll, 1939
 Nannocharax signifer Moritz, 2010
 Nannocharax taenia Boulenger, 1902
 Nannocharax usongo Dunz & Schliewen, 2009
 Nannocharax zebra Dunz & Schliewen, 2009

References

Distichodontidae
Taxa named by Albert Günther
Fish of Africa